The Investigators is an Irish scientific television series broadcast on RTÉ One. The series examines some of the most interesting projects being worked on by leading Irish scientists across the globe and assesses what potential impact they may have in the future. The selection of projects is diverse, ranging from the identification of a protein which may help to arrest and even reverse the onset of Alzheimer's disease to the design of a camera which can capture an extraterrestrial event that happened billions of years ago. Each programme focuses on a specific area of life such as Ireland in Space, Ageing, Sensors, Climate Change, Crops of the Future and the Nano Revolution. The series airs each Thursday at 23:05.

Synopsis

Series one 
Series one was broadcast on RTÉ in seven parts from 8 November 2007.

Series two
Series two began broadcasting on 6 November 2008. It featured researchers from UCD in five of its episodes.

References

External links
 Official sites: Series 1 Series 2 RTÉ site

2007 Irish television series debuts
Irish documentary television series
RTÉ original programming